The Holy Trinity Cathedral is a religious building belonging to the Roman Catholic Church located in downtown Kingston, the capital, and most populous city, in the Caribbean island nation of Jamaica. It is located between North Street and George Headley Drive.

The church is the seat of metropolitan archbishop and was consecrated in 1911. The Byzantine Revival design was by the American architect Raymond F. Almirall. The Pope John Paul II paid a visit on 10 August 1993.

It was built after the destruction, in the earthquake of 1907, of the Church of the Holy Trinity in the Duke and Sutton streets. It is located on a site adjacent to Winchester Park, the works beginning in 1908.

See also
Roman Catholicism in Jamaica
Holy Trinity Cathedral (disambiguation)

References

Roman Catholic cathedrals in Jamaica
Buildings and structures in Kingston, Jamaica
Roman Catholic churches completed in 1911
20th-century Roman Catholic church buildings